Patrick Gordon (1635–1699) was a Scottish general in the Russian army.

Patrick Gordon may also refer to:
Patrick Gordon of Auchindoun (1538–1594), Scottish landowner and rebel
Patrick Gordon (governor) (died 1736), governor of the Province of Pennsylvania, 1726–1736
Patrick Gordon (footballer) (1870–?), Scottish footballer
Patrick Hunter Gordon (1916–1978), Scottish soldier and electrical engineer
Pat Gordon, Coronation Street character